Party Girls / Broken Poets marked a partial return to a major label for singer-songwriter Elliott Murphy and was distributed throughout Europe on WEA and in the US on the independent Austin, Texas label Dejadisc. The album was nominated for the 1984 New York Music Award for Album of the year. Special guests included former New York Dolls front man David Johansen who contributed guest vocals on "Blues Responsibility" as well as Violent Femmes member Brian Ritchie contributed a bass solo on the title cut "Party Girls and Broken Poets."

Track listing
All tracks composed by Elliott Murphy

"Three Complete American Novels"
"Winners, Losers, Beggars, Choosers"
"Doctor Calabash"
"Blues Responsibility'"
"Saving Time"
"Party Girls and Broken Poets"
"Like a Rocket"
"Last Call"
"Something New"
"The Streets of New York" 
"In a Minute"
"Everybody Knows (Niagara Falls)"

Personnel
Elliott Murphy – vocals, guitar, harmonica, keyboards
Tony Machine – drums
Ernie Brooks – bass
Richard Sohl – keyboards
David Johansen – guest vocals
Brian Ritchie  – guest guitarist

References

1984 albums
Elliott Murphy albums